Black Metal is the second album by English heavy metal band Venom. It was released in November 1982, during the great flourishing of metal music in the UK that was the new wave of British heavy metal, and is considered a major influence on the thrash metal, death metal and black metal scenes that emerged in the 1980s and early 1990s.

Although the album lent its name to the latter subgenre of heavy metal, today it is still debated if the album's music is speed metal, thrash metal or black metal. AllMusic has described it as "extreme metal", while Moynihan & Søderlind in their book affirm that the album "carved in stone some of [black metal's] essential features". Nevertheless, its lyrics and imagery were a major influence on the early Norwegian black metal scene.

Background
After the release and general positive reception to the band's debut album, Venom had established themselves as pariahs of the metal world. With the band having built a strong fan base in Europe following a series of successful shows, Venom would return to the studio to record their follow up sophomore effort. With vocalist and bassist Conrad "Cronos" Lant having gained more experience in the studio as an engineer, as well as the band developing a better understanding of their identity allowed Venom to better sense what they were looking to accomplish in the studio.

Writing and recording
As with most of Venom's early material, much of the writing was left to Lant and Dunn. Two of the songs on the album, "Buried Alive" and Raise the Dead", were written in the late 1970s and were originally intended to be on the band's debut album, however the band felt that they were unable to do the songs justice at the time of those demo recordings. Early versions of these songs can be heard on the band's 1979 Church Hall rehearsals recording, with original vocalist Clive Archer. "Buried Alive" was originally less than a minute long, and the remainder of what would be the rest of the song was used as the first half of "Raise the Dead" but with different lyrics. The band decided to rework these two songs with the final recording having "Buried Alive" extended and the ending transitioning into "Raise the Dead". With Lant's experience in the studio he took a very hands on approach with recording "Buried Alive". For the intro of song, the band was looking to mimic the sound of earth being shovelled onto a coffin during a burial service while a priest delivers a prayer, but they failed to capture the sound they were looking for by cutting cabbages. So they decided to bring in a cardboard box and mud, then put microphones in the box and used spades to shovel the mud into the box onto the microphones.

The title track, an ode to the extreme metal genre, opens with the sounds of a chainsaw which the band created by clamping down some large steel plates and then brought in a real chainsaw into the studio which they used on the steel plates to create the sawing sound effect. In the process, Lant stated that all of the saw's teeth broke in trying to achieve this effect. Another song on the album, "Countess Bathory", was written when "Abaddon" was late for a session, so Dunn began jamming some new riffs while Lant would work the lyrics out. The band's roadie came in the room and began drumming for them, and soon after "Abaddon" would come in and tried to make up a new drum pattern, but Lant and Dunn felt the roadie's drum pattern worked best. Lant also explained the origin of the song's opening riff, saying that it was inspired by the opening theme song of the children's show The Magic Roundabout. The opening riff would then purportedly go on to influence the main riff of Nirvana's "Smells Like Teen Spirit".

The final track on the album is a preview of the title track for what was to be the band's third album, At War with Satan. A concept album that Lant started working on originally when he was still in school that tells the story of the battle between Heaven and Hell and with the latter coming out on top. Lant thought it would be interesting to put a teaser at the end of the record as a warning to fans of what was to come. The album was recorded in just 7 days, with Lant working long hours recording alongside the studio engineer and then mixing the tracks on his own.

Music and lyrics
The album's tracks have been described as being composed of "speed, catchy speed, rhythmic explosions and cutting riffs", as well as being characterised by "a rough low-budget production like a gig in the cellar". Much like Welcome to Hell, Black Metal  also maintains a very unpolished and underproduced sound due to the label's time constraints as well as Lant's desire to get the "heaviest sound I could get" on tape.

Lyrically the band continues to explore Satanic themes ("To Hell and Back", "Leave Me in Hell", "Sacrifice", "Heaven's on Fire") and witchcraft ("Don't Burn the Witch"). Other themes include nightmare scenarios ("Buried Alive", "Raise the Dead"), horror mythology ("Countess Bathory") and adolescent sexual fantasies ("Teacher's Pet").

Artwork

The album cover was designed by Cronos in black and white, originally done in Tipp-Ex, shows the face of a demon with a pentacle on its forehead. An inverted cross is on the left horn and the inscription 666 on the right horn. Above the head of the demon's face is the band's wordmark logo reading "Venom" and the album title at the bottom in gothic characters separated by the bottom of the demon's face with the word "BLACK" on the left and "METAL" on the right. On early copies of the album the title was written in black on black in relief, therefore only observable against the light, while the following prints have the title written in white characters. On the back of the cover there is also an apparent anti-piracy icon with the inscription: "Home Taping Is Killing Music … So Are Venom".

Release and reception

The album was released in Great Britain on 1 November 1982 on NEAT Records. Included with the first album prints was an insert with the lyrics of the songs in gothic characters and a mini-poster in black and white depicting the members of the group. "Mantas" is portrayed posing next to a motorcycle with a wall of Marshall amplifiers in the background; "Abaddon" is locked up behind the rusted steel bars of a secret-style cell in a medieval castle; and "Cronos", armed with a ritual dagger, is kept on a leash by a woman who is wearing a leather jacket but is naked from the waist down. The NEAT Records label on the second side of the original vinyl had color variations of silver, blue, green and red.

The album was released to massive acclaim from the metal underground as well as garnering overwhelming praise from mainstream critics as well, and has since gone on to be recognised as one of the most influential metal albums ever released. Sounds, much like in their 1981 review of Welcome to Hell, gave yet another perfect five-star review of Black Metal. Eduardo Rivadavia of AllMusic gave the album a near perfect 4.5 out of 5 stars, and points to the title track, "Raise the Dead" and "Acid Queen" as  "proto-thrashing classics", "Leave Me in Hell" as "surprisingly complex", "Teacher's Pet" as "unusually goofy" and "Bloodlust" and "Countess Bathory" as "absolute classics" stating that "Black Metal is right up there with its predecessor". Martin Popoff of Collector's Guide to Heavy Metal gave the album eight out of a possible 10 stars in his November 2005 review.

Tour
Jonathan "Jonny Z" Zazula, a small time importer from New York, concert promoter and co-founder of Megaforce Records, ordered several boxes of Welcome to Hell from Neat Records to sell at his record stall in a shopping mall. Soon after "Jonny Z" ordered more and asked Neat if Venom were interested in doing shows in the States. The band wasn't sure how they would get their pyros to put on a proper show to the States as well as trying to find an opening act, however, an importer friend of Lants showed him a bootlegged video of a new band from San Francisco where the guitarist was wearing a Venom shirt, Metallica. Venom played two shows at the Staten Island Paramount Theatre with Metallica opening for them on 22 and 24 April. On the second night, considerable damage was done to the venue when explosives and a fireball from the pyrotechnics created a four-foot hole in the stage and the fireball shot across the building coming to rest in the upper balcony. Lant had also dealt several blows to his own speakers, destroying his stacks. When the technician assessed the damage done, the total cost for repairs amounted to "666" dollars. After successful shows in the States Venom was already planning their return to America before they had even left.

The band returned to Europe and was set to headline Aardschokdag, an annual Heavy metal festival held in the Netherlands, in June 1983. However, their equipment had been impounded by U.S. Customs in New York following their shows with Metallica in April. As a result, the band was forced to withdraw from the festival and also had to cancel their planned European tour. Venom was replaced by Accept, but still decided to show up to Aardschokdag and signed autographs stage side and also went onstage before Accept began their set to apologise to the 9000 fans for not being able to perform. Although they didn't play, they still received one of the largest receptions of the night. With no tour and plenty of time to spare, Venom and manager Eric Cook decided to embark on a promotional tour in France where the band was interviewed on Metal radio shows and participated in in-store autograph sessions.

Legacy
Robert Dimery included the album in his book 1001 Albums You Must Hear Before You Die. Dimery wrote that Black Metal is the "perfect parody", which had "shocked many critics and parents... Only few could have imagined that this would create a 'true dark subculture'". In 1998, it was voted 52nd among the "100 Albums You Must Hear Before You Die" by readers of British magazine Kerrang!.

Numerous artists have cited Black Metal as a major influence on them, spawning many cover songs from the album by bands including Dimmu Borgir, Mayhem, Blitzkrieg, and Cradle of Filth. Drummer Jonas Åkerlund, of Swedish extreme metal band Bathory, cites the track "Countess Bathory" as the inspiration for the band's name. Pantera vocalist Phil Anselmo has the band's wordmark and demon face tattooed on his lower back. He also lists Black Metal as one of his "five essential metal albums". Anselmo stated:

The title track was featured on the soundtrack of the 2005 video game Tony Hawk's American Wasteland.

Track listing

Credits
Cronos (Conrad Lant) – vocals, bass, artwork
Mantas (Jeffrey Dunn) – guitars
Abaddon (Anthony Bray) – drums
Keith Nichol - producer, engineer

Covers
Alchemist covered "Black Metal" for a tribute album.
Blitzkrieg covered "Countess Bathory" on their album Unholy Trinity.
 Cradle of Filth covered the song "Black Metal" on the special edition of their album Cruelty and the Beast.
Dark Forest, a black metal band from Brazil, covered the song "Black Metal" on their demo Sodomized by Depraved Goat from 2003.
Dimmu Borgir covered the song "Black Metal", as the Japanese version bonus track on their album In Sorte Diaboli.
Heidenland covered "Black Metal" as a hidden track on the 1999 demo cassette Triomftocht voor de glorie van Wodan.
Hypocrisy did a cover of the song "Black Metal" on the album Osculum Obscenum.
Isegrim made a cover album called A Tribute to Venom.
Macabre covered "Countess Bathory" on Grim Scary Tales.
Machetazo covered "Black Metal"; it appears on their compilation Ultratumba.
Mayhem, whose guitarist and bandleader Euronymous hailed Venom as an important black metal band, covered "Black Metal" on their Pure Fucking Armageddon demo.
Messiah Marcolin did a cover of "Countess Bathory".
Necrodeath made a cover of "Countess Bathory" on their album Draculea released in 2007.
Obituary covered "Buried Alive" for their greatest hits compilation, entitled Anthology.
Sigh covered multiple songs off of this album (as well as other Venom albums) on To Hell and Back: Sigh's Tribute to Venom in 1995, and on A Tribute to Venom in 2008, along with other EPs and splits.
The Soft Pink Truth, Drew Daniel of  Matmos' house side project, covered the title track on his 2014 record Why Do The Heathen Rage?
Unleashed covered "Countess Bathory" on Shadows in the Deep.
Vader covered "Black Metal" on their album Necropolis.
Macabre covered "Countess Bathory" for their album Grim Scary Tales.
Warpath covered "Black Metal" for their album When War Begins.
Kazjurol covered "Countess Bathory" for their EP Body Slam.

References

Venom (band) albums
1982 albums
Combat Records albums